Richard Bragdon  (born 1975 or 1976) is a Canadian politician who was elected to represent the riding of Tobique—Mactaquac in the House of Commons of Canada for the Conservative Party in the 2019 Canadian federal election. During the 43rd Canadian Parliament Bragdon's private member bill An Act to establish a framework to reduce recidivism (Bill C-228) was adopted to require the Minister of Public Safety and Emergency Preparedness, within one year, to develop a federal framework to reduce recidivism.

In June 2021, Richard Bragdon voted “Nay” to Bill C-6 which would make conversion therapy illegal in Canada.

Electoral record

References

External links

1970s births
Living people
Conservative Party of Canada MPs
Members of the House of Commons of Canada from New Brunswick
People from Woodstock, New Brunswick
21st-century Canadian politicians
People from York County, New Brunswick